Angus Buchanan may refer to:

 Angus Buchanan (VC) (1894–1944), English recipient of the Victoria Cross
 Angus Buchanan (rugby union) (1847–1927), Scottish international rugby and cricket player
 Angus A. Buchanan (1861–1914), merchant and political figure in Nova Scotia, Canada
 Angus Gladstone Buchanan (1893–1960), fish merchant and political figure in Nova Scotia, Canada